Aegiphila lhotskiana (orth. var. Aegiphila lhotskyana Cham.) is a species of flowering plant in the family Lamiaceae. It is native to South America, where it occurs in Bolivia and Brazil. This species is cited in Flora Brasiliensis by Carl Friedrich Philipp von Martius.

A number of abietane diterpenes have been isolated from this plant.

References

lhotskiana
Trees of Bolivia
Trees of Brazil
Flora of the Cerrado